Rejoice Christian School is a private PreK-12 Christian school located in Owasso, Oklahoma. There are over 850 students on roll.

History

Rejoice Christian School was founded in 1992 by the First Free Will Baptist Church. It started as a pre-school and a kindergarten with only 40 students but eventually began serving all grade levels.

In 2014, Rejoice Christian School received a $50 million donation from the Eddy Gibbs Family Trust, allowing them to consolidate into one campus.

Academics

Rejoice Christian School is accredited by the ACSI.

The Advanced Placement (AP) courses offered are Calculus AB, Psychology, and English Literature and Composition.

Demographics

The demographic breakdown by race/ethnicity of the 691 K–12 students enrolled for the 2017–2018 school year was:

References

External links 
 

Christian schools in Oklahoma
Schools in Tulsa County, Oklahoma
1992 establishments in Oklahoma
Educational institutions established in 1992